General elections were held in the Netherlands on Wednesday 9 June 2010. This was triggered by the fall of Prime Minister Jan Peter Balkenende's fourth cabinet on 20 February with Queen Beatrix accepting the resignation of the Labour Party (PvdA) ministers on 23 February. The conservative-liberal People's Party for Freedom and Democracy (VVD), led by Mark Rutte, won the largest number of seats in the House of Representatives while the social-democratic PvdA, led by Job Cohen, came a narrow second. The election was also noted for the rise of the Party for Freedom (PVV), which came third, led by controversial politician Geert Wilders. On the other hand, Balkenende's Christian Democratic Appeal (CDA) saw a poor result, losing half its seats and dropping from first to fourth place. The Socialist Party (SP) also lost seats. Notably, the 31 seats won by the VVD was its most since 1998, and the one-seat margin between the VVD and PvdA is the closest on record.

After the election, the formation of a new government took 127 days. Both the VVD and the PvdA hoped to have a leading role. VVD talks with the PvdA and other left-wing parties (trying to form a so-called Purple Coalition without Christian parties) broke down; however, Rutte was able to form a right-wing coalition of the VVD and CDA, with the PVV formally making an agreement (gedoogakkoord) to support the government but without holding any cabinet seats. It was the first coalition government not to be led by a Christian democratic or socialist party in 92 years, as well as the first to be led by the VVD. Rutte was sworn in as Prime Minister on 14 October, becoming the first liberal to hold that post since 1918.

The 150 seats of the House of Representatives (Tweede Kamer der Staten-Generaal) were contested, and were filled using party-list proportional representation for a nominal four-year term.



Background

The election follows the PvdA's withdrawal in February from the coalition over the contribution of Dutch soldiers to the War in Afghanistan. According to the Dutch constitution new elections had to be held within 83 days.

Debates
The first radio debate was held on 21 May 2010. The first television debate, held on 23 May was, according to instant polls, won by Mark Rutte on 36%, with Job Cohen second on 24%, and Geert Wilders and Jan Peter Balkenende third, on 18%.

Opinion polls

Polls indicated that the elections were too close to call.

Results
Turnout was reported to be over 5% less than the previous elections allegedly due to heavy rain and stormy weather.

By province

Reactions
Prime Minister Jan Peter Balkenende stepped down from his position in the CDA and resigned his parliamentary seat on the evening of the election, saying he was taking "political responsibility" for the unsatisfactory election results of his party and that "The voter has spoken, the outcome is clear."

Government formation

Expectations were that the formation of a new government would take some time. The international media also read this as a slim victory for the "austerity-minded" Liberals amidst the 2010 European sovereign debt crisis.

On 14 October, Mark Rutte was sworn in as prime minister. Rutte's government resigned on 24 April 2012 over austerity measures.

Analysis
Some international media speculated that "for the first time in this nation's history, a Jewish man, albeit a secular one, is on the verge of becoming the next prime minister ... Job Cohen, who was until recently the Mayor of Amsterdam, and represents the top of the ticket for the PvdA ... is at the end of a long battle to run the country that began in February when the PvdA backed out of the ruling coalition government because it did not want to send Dutch troops back to Afghanistan."

See also
List of members of the House of Representatives of the Netherlands, 2010–12
List of candidates in the 2010 Dutch general election

References

External links
 NSD: European Election Database - Netherlands publishes regional level election data; allows for comparisons of election results, 1994–2010

2010
2010 elections in the Netherlands
June 2010 events in Europe